Thonon Evian Grand Genève Football Club, formerly Evian Thonon Gaillard FC, commonly referred to as Thonon Evian or just Evian, is a French association football club based in Thonon-les-Bains that was founded on 1 July 2007. It competes in the Championnat National 2, the fourth tier of the French football league system.

Evian's predecessor were known as FC Gaillard and existed from 1924 to 2003. Gaillard's only notable success was winning the Division d'Honneur of the Rhône-Alpes region in 1999. Evian proved more successful, ascending to the professional divisions after just three seasons. The club won the Championnat de France Amateur in 2008, the Championnat National in 2010, and finally the Ligue 2 in 2011.

Evian formerly played its home matches at the Stade Joseph-Moynat in Thonon-les-Bains but moved to the Parc des Sports in nearby Annecy for the 2010–11 season as the Joseph-Moynat did not meet the standards of the Ligue de Football Professionnel. The move was a temporary measure while the club contemplated building a new facility or renovating the Stade Joseph-Moynat. Prior to moving to Annecy, Evian sought to play at the Stade de Genève over the Swiss border in nearby Geneva. Until the 2013–14 season, the club's main sponsor was Groupe Danone, owner of the Evian brand of mineral water. Danone's CEO Franck Riboud was honorary president of the club.

At the end of the 2015–16 season, the club was relegated from Ligue 2, and further demoted by the DNCG to the Championnat de France Amateur, the fourth level of football in France. The club then entered receivership meaning that, even if it had survived, it would have suffered a further administrative relegation at the end of the 2016–17 season. The club withdrew from the competition on 9 August.The club reformed in the regional leagues, and won back-to-back promotions in 2019 and 2020 to gain a place in Championnat National 3 for the 2020–21 season. In May 2021, it was announced that the club had become a member of the STRIVE football group, with US team FC Miami City and Belgian team Royal FC Mandel United.

History

Football in Gaillard 

In 2003 Football Croix-de-Savoie 74 was formed as a result of a merger between FC Gaillard and FC Ville-la-Grand. Gaillard was founded in 1924 and spent most of its life playing in the Ligue Rhône-Alpes, while Ville-la-Grand was founded in 1928. The new club finished 3rd in the Championnat de France amateur (CFA) Groupe B section for the 2003–04 season. Normally, only the top club in each of the four amateur groups are promoted to the Championnat National; however, both the 1st and 2nd placed clubs in the group were reserve sides of professional teams, namely Lyon and Metz. As such, Croix-de-Savoie was promoted. The club's first season in National saw them narrowly avoid relegation, finishing 14th out of 20, two points above relegated 17th place Besançon. The 2005–06 season was less successful; Croix-de-Savoie finished 18th with 41 points, one point behind SO Châtellerault, thus falling back to the fourth division. Croix-de-Savoie's average attendance also dropped from 933 to 716.

The foundation

In 2007, a merger between Croix-de-Savoie 74 and Olympique Thonon Chablais created Olympique Croix-de-Savoie 74. Whilst the former club had been heavily associated with the commune of Gaillard, the new club moved to the nearby commune of Thonon-les-Bains because the stadium in Gaillard was, in August 2005, deemed unfit for use in the National division. The decision resulted in club being forced to move to Stade Joseph-Moynat in Thonon, a facility with 2,700 seats and a total capacity of 6,000. The club returned to the Championnat National as the CFA Group B winners (with a record 108 points) for the 2008–09 season. In the summer of 2009, the president of the Groupe Danone, Franck Riboud, was made honorary president of the football club. Riboud yet again changed the name of the team to Evian Thonon Gaillard Football Club. He also put money into the team to improve the youth system of the club and harboured aspirations of the side achieving promotion to Ligue 2. On 16 April 2010, the club completed the feat in Riboud's first season presiding over the club achieving promotion to Ligue 2, for the first time, following its 1–0 victory over Amiens.

After earning promotion to Ligue 2 for the 2010–11 season, Evian was rumoured to be pursuing a move to play its home matches at the Stade de la Praille in Geneva, Switzerland after it was determined that the club's current facility, the Stade Joseph-Moynat, did not meet the Ligue de Football Professionnel's (LFP) standards. Thonon-les-Bains, the commune where the club situates itself, is a few kilometres from the Swiss border and is only , a 45-minute car drive, from the city of Geneva. It was reported that the club's president, Patrick Trotignon, had been advocating the move since the beginning of the 2009–10 Championnat National season just in case the club achieved promotion to the second division. The vice-president of Swiss club Servette FC, the regular occupant of the stadium, questioned the move citing possible schedule conflicts, as well as the health of the pitch if both clubs were to use the stadium on a weekly basis. However, Benoît Genecand, president of Fondation du Stade de Genève (FSG), which owned and operated the facility, disputed the claims of the Servette official. Servette responded immediately to Genecand's comments via a press release posted on the club's official website. Evian petitioned to the State Council of Geneva and obtained approval from the LFP for the move in early May. On 20 May 2010, Evian received a favourable ruling from the French Football Federation (FFF) with the Federal Council voting in favour of the move. According to the federation, the move now had to be agreed upon by a UEFA executive committee. On 8 June, UEFA officially denied Evian's request to play at the Stade de la Praille meaning the club would play its home matches at the Parc des Sports in nearby Annecy.

On 9 January 2011, Evian recorded an upset victory over the defending French champions Olympique de Marseille in the Coupe de France, defeating the Ligue 1 club 3–1 in the Round of 64. Strong form throughout the season saw Evian secure a second successive promotion as champions of Ligue 2.

In their first season in Ligue 1, Les Roses finished in a respectable ninth place, one place above French giants Marseille.  In the following season, the club finished in sixteenth position, avoiding relegation by just two points. Evian also reached the Coupe de France final for the first time in the club's history, where they were beaten 3–2 by Bordeaux, falling victim to a last-minute winner by Cheick Diabaté.

Relegation and dissolution
At the end of the 2015–16 Ligue 2 season, the club finished in the relegation places. The DNCG imposed an additional relegation for the subsequent season, which would place Evian in the fourth tier of the French football pyramid, the Championnat de France Amateur (CFA). On 2 August 2016 the club was placed in receivership, given a probationary period of two months to save itself, and assessed a further administrative relegation at the end of the 2016–17 season.

On 9 August, the French Football Federation confirmed Evian's decision to cease operation in the CFA and it collapsed and folded.

Reformation, merger, rise

On 7 December 2016, Evian was renamed Thonon Evian Savoie Football Club.

In 2018, Thonon Evian Savoie FC and Union Sportive Evian Lugrin FC merged to form Thonon Evian FC.

In 2019, the new club won promotion from the Régional 2 to the Régional 1 of the Auvergne-Rhône-Alpes league. This was followed in 2020 by promotion to Championnat National 3, and promotion to the Championnat National 2 in 2022.

Honours

Domestic

League 
Ligue 2:
Winners (1): 2010–11
Championnat National:
Winners (1): 2009–10
Championnat de France Amateur:
Winners (1): 2007–08
Championnat National 3:
Winners (1): 2021–22
Régional 1 Auvergne-Rhône-Alpes:
Winners (1): 2019–20
Régional 2 Auvergne-Rhône-Alpes:
Winners (1): 2018–19

Cups 
Coupe de France:
Runners-up (1): 2012–13

Players

First team squad
As of 8 July 2022.

Managerial history

References

External links 
 

 
Association football clubs established in 2007
2007 establishments in France
Sport in Haute-Savoie
Works association football teams
Football clubs in Auvergne-Rhône-Alpes
Ligue 1 clubs